Belgium was represented by Reynaert, with the song "Laissez briller le soleil", at the 1988 Eurovision Song Contest, which took place in Dublin on 30 April. Reynaert was the winner of the Belgian national final for the contest, held in Brussels on 27 February.

Before Eurovision

Eurosong '88 
French-language broadcaster RTBF was in charge of the selection of the Belgian entry for the 1988 Contest. The national final was held at the RTBF studios, hosted by Patrick Duhamel. The winner was chosen by an expert jury and a public jury. The full results of the voting were not made public, and only the winning song was announced.

At Eurovision 
On the night of the final Reynaert performed 16th in the running order, following Norway and preceding Luxembourg. At the close of the voting "Laissez briller le soleil" had received 5 points, placing Belgium joint 18th (with Portugal) of the 21 entries. The Belgian jury awarded its 12 points to the United Kingdom.

Voting

References

External links 
 Belgian Preselection 1988

1988
Countries in the Eurovision Song Contest 1988
Eurovision